Park Eun-Chul (Hangul: 박은철, Hanja: 朴殷哲;  or ; born January 18, 1981, in Cheongju, Chungcheongbuk-do) is a South Korean wrestler who won the Bronze medal in the Men's Greco-Roman 55kg in the 2008 Summer Olympics in Beijing. He is also a Three-time world championship medalist, receiving Bronze in 2006, and  Silver in 2005 and 2007. He lost both his world championship finals matches to Hamid Sourian. Park eventually beat Sourian in the Bronze medal match at the 2008 Summer Olympics.

References
sports-reference

1981 births
Living people
South Korean male sport wrestlers
Olympic bronze medalists for South Korea
Olympic wrestlers of South Korea
Wrestlers at the 2008 Summer Olympics
Olympic medalists in wrestling
Wrestlers at the 2006 Asian Games
Medalists at the 2008 Summer Olympics
World Wrestling Championships medalists
Asian Games competitors for South Korea
South Korean Buddhists
People from Cheongju
Sportspeople from North Chungcheong Province
20th-century South Korean people
21st-century South Korean people